Where It's At is the second studio album by American country music artist Dustin Lynch. It was released on September 9, 2014 by Broken Bow Records. Mickey Jack Cones produced 12 of the 15 songs with Brett Beavers and Luke Wooten co-producing 3 of the 15. Lynch co-wrote five of the album's fifteen tracks. The album's first single, "Where It's At", was released to country radio on March 31, 2014 and became his first number one single on the Country Airplay chart. The album's second single, "Hell of a Night", was released to country radio on November 3, 2014. and became his second number one single on the Country Airplay chart. The album's third single, "Mind Reader", was released to country radio on September 28, 2015, and became his third number one single on the Country Airplay chart.

Commercial performance
The album debuted at number 8 on the Billboard 200 chart, and number 2 on the Top Country Albums chart with 31,000 copies sold in its first week. The album has sold 138,700 copies in the US as of May 2016.

Track listing
All tracks produced by Mickey Jack Cones except 3, 10 and 14, produced by Brett Beavers and Luke Wooten.

Personnel
Jimmy Carter – bass guitar
Mickey Jack Cones – acoustic guitar, electric guitar, percussion, programming, synthesizer, background vocals
J.T. Corenflos – electric guitar
Zach Crowell – percussion, programming, synthesizer, synthesizer bass
Larry Hall – string arrangements, conductor
Tommy Harden – drums
Tony Harrell – keyboards
Wes Hightower – background vocals
Mark Hill – bass guitar
Matt Jenkins – background vocals
Mike Johnson – pedal steel guitar
Troy Lancaster – electric guitar
B. James Lowry – banjo, acoustic guitar
Dustin Lynch – lead vocals, background vocals
Jerry McPherson – electric guitar
Jimmy Robbins – programming
Mike Rojas – keyboards, organ, synthesizer
Bryan Sutton – acoustic guitar, mandolin
Russell Terrell – background vocals
Brady Tilow – percussion, programming
Lonnie Wilson – drums, percussion, programming
Casey Wood – percussion, programming
Luke Wooten – electric guitar, background vocals

Charts

Weekly charts

Year-end charts

Singles

References

2014 albums
Dustin Lynch albums
BBR Music Group albums